Ghiyasuddin Bahadur Shah II (also Khizr Khan Suri, reigned: 1555–1561) was an independent ruler of Bengal. He was the son of Sultan Shamsuddin Muhammad Shah.

History
Bahadur Shah came to power after deposing the governor Shahbaz Khan. During his reign Bahadur Shah killed Muhammad Adil Shah in 1557.

Later Bahadur Shah  tried to capture Jaunpur  but he was defeated by Mughal forces.

See also
List of rulers of Bengal
History of Bengal
History of India

References

16th-century Indian monarchs
Sultans of Bengal
16th-century Indian Muslims
Indian people of Pashtun descent
Indian people of Afghan descent
16th-century Afghan people